Cynic  is an American progressive metal band formed in Miami, Florida in 1987 and later re-formed in Los Angeles, California in 2007, where the sole surviving member, Paul Masvidal remains to this day. Cynic incorporates elements of progressive rock, alternative, and metal.

Their first album, Focus, was released in 1993. Cynic disbanded in 1994, but they reunited in 2006 and released their second album in 2008. Traced in Air was released through French label Season of Mist, followed up by an EP titled Re-Traced in 2010 and an EP titled Carbon-Based Anatomy in 2011. Their third studio album, Kindly Bent to Free Us, was released in 2014.

In December 2017, after two years of an uncertain future, founding member Sean Reinert confirmed his split from Cynic. Reinert died at the age of 48 in January 2020. Longtime Cynic bass player Sean Malone died at the age of 50 eleven months later, leaving Masvidal as the only remaining original core member.

History

Demo era (1987–1991) 
Cynic was formed by guitarist and frontman Paul Masvidal and drummer Sean Reinert in 1987. In 1988, the band made their first recording, simply called the 88 Demo. After the demo, Paul Masvidal took over vocal duties, while continuing to play guitar. The band also added a second guitarist, Jason Gobel. Another demo followed in 1989, titled Reflections of a Dying World. 1989 also brought the addition of bassist Tony Choy. In 1990, the group went to the studio to record their third demo, plainly titled 90 Demo. In 1991, Cynic signed with Roadrunner Records and recorded their fourth and final demo, known as Demo 1991.

Recording Focus (1993) 

The recording of Cynic's full-length debut album Focus did not begin immediately after the band signed a new contract with Roadrunner Records. Paul Masvidal and Sean Reinert had played on Death's 1991 album Human and were obligated to take part in the supporting tour of Europe. During this tour, Death ran into serious financial trouble, which resulted in Masvidal and Reinert's gear being confiscated for six months by a UK promoter. During this time, the band parted with bassist Tony Choy (who joined Atheist). Choy was replaced by Sean Malone. The band planned to record Focus in August 1992, but the day they were to begin recording, Hurricane Andrew struck Florida and destroyed both Gobel's home and the band's rehearsal space, leading to months of delay. The band used this time as an opportunity to write new material, much of which is featured on Focus. Tony Teegarden was eventually brought in to do the death growls, but all the vocoder vocals were recorded by Masvidal.

Focus was released internationally September 14, 1993.

Cynic toured extensively worldwide throughout 1993 and 1994, including the Dynamo Open Air Festival in May 1994.

Asked in a 2012 interview on Prog-Sphere.com about Focus material, Masvidal says:

First disbandment (1994−2006) 
Musical and personal differences halted work on a second studio album, as the group disbanded, with most of its members turning to side projects.

Gobel, Masvidal, and Reinert, with bassist Chris Kringel and vocalist/keyboardist Aruna Abrams, formed the short-lived Portal in 1994. The band's music featured slower tempos and very few distorted guitars compared to Cynic, but still had a complex, layered sound. A total of 10 tracks were recorded as pre-production demos, which were never officially released until 2012, where it was released as The Portal Tapes under the Cynic name. Masvidal and Reinert released an album with a more recent project, the indie act Æon Spoke, on SPV Records and Kringel also played with them, touring the UK in 2005. The members of Cynic loosely reunited (playing with Bill Bruford, Steve Hackett, and Jim Matheos on various tracks) on Gordian Knot's second album, Emergent.

Reunion (2006−2007) 
In September 2006, Paul Masvidal announced that Cynic was reuniting to perform during spring/summer of 2007. During June/July/August 2007, they played 15 shows across Europe, predominantly at major metal/rock festivals. The setlist consisted of songs from Focus, Portal's demo, a cover of Mahavishnu Orchestra's "Meeting of the Spirits," and a new song, "Evolutionary Sleeper."

The reunion lineup featured founding members Masvidal on guitar/vocals and Reinert on drums. Gobel, the longtime guitarist who played on Focus, could not participate due to family and work commitments, and David "Mavis" Senescu was brought aboard as a replacement. Malone, who played bass on Focus, was unavailable due to teaching and work commitments, and Chris Kringel, who played bass on the 1993 European tour, was brought in as a replacement. All death growls were handled by pre-recordings of Teegarden. All keyboards were covered by Masvidal and Senescu using guitar synths.

In early 2008, the band announced plans to complete a second studio album. Malone rejoined the lineup and Dutch guitarist Tymon Kruidenier of Exivious was added, the latter contributing death growls.

Traced in Air and Re-Traced (2008−2011) 

Traced in Air was released internationally November 17, 2008, on Season of Mist, followed by Robin Zielhorst being added as touring bassist.

The band played at the Wacken Open Air festival. The Traced in Air tour cycle began in Autumn 2008 with direct support slots for Opeth on their European tour.

Starting in February 2009, Cynic toured North America with Meshuggah and The Faceless, and beginning April 15, 2009, Cynic toured North America in support of DragonForce.

During the 2010 tour in support of Between the Buried and Me, along with Scale the Summit and the Devin Townsend Project, the band performed live "an experiment" titled "Wheels Within Wheels." Shortly after unveiling this new work, the band announced a new EP coming soon on their MySpace blog. Masvidal revealed in an interview the plans for the coming EP:

Later blogs on MySpace revealed that the new EP would be titled Re-Traced.

In May 2010, Cynic announced plans for their first US headlining tour. Titled "Re-Traced / Re-Focused Live", the tour found Cynic performing their debut album Focus in its entirety, among other tracks. The tour was co-sponsored by Decibel Magazine as its inaugural "Hall of Fame" tour series. It kicked off on July 22, 2010, in Los Angeles with Intronaut and Dysrhythmia as supporting bands. The tour ended on August 13, 2010. The final show of the tour took place in Fort Lauderdale, Florida; it was the first time in 16 years the band returned to their hometown to perform.

In December 2010, the band announced that bassist Robin Zielhorst and guitarist Tymon Kruidenier were no longer in Cynic due to logistical and various other reasons. In the same announcement, Masvidal and Reinert set the approximate release schedule for Cynic's next album, stating that "the new Cynic release should be coming in late 2011 on the Season of Mist label", and, in addition, "[t]hey are also working towards a remixed re-release of their classic recording 'Focus.'"

Carbon-Based Anatomy and Kindly Bent to Free Us (2011−2014) 

Cynic's website announced that the band was working on a new album and the "first baby steps into this gigantic process are being taken right now, creating little embryos of songs that will turn into fully fledged Cynic tunes over the course of the following months."

On September 6, 2011, Cynic announced a new EP titled Carbon-Based Anatomy would be released on November 11, 2011, in Europe, and November 15, 2011, in the United States. The artwork was designed by Robert Venosa, the artist behind the cover artworks of Focus, Traced in Air and Re-Traced, shortly before his death. All bass parts on Carbon-Based Anatomy were recorded by Sean Malone, who had also previously recorded the bass parts to Focus and Traced in Air.

Paul Masvidal describes this new EP as: 

On October 10, 2011, Cynic uploaded one song from the new EP titled "Carbon-Based Anatomy" and announced that Brandon Giffin and Max Phelps would be playing live with the band. Brandon Giffin is a former bassist for The Faceless and Max Phelps will play the second guitar and provide backing vocals. The band completed a North American and European tour in support of the EP in November and December 2011.

Commenting on a musical shift from metal elements in an interview on Prog-Sphere.com, Masvidal says:

In March 2012, Cynic released via Season of Mist an album of demos that were produced as a follow-up to Focus back in 1995, entitled The Portal Tapes.

On December 12, 2012, Cynic announced through their official website that Masvidal, Reinert and Sean Malone were entering the studio in "trio mode" to record their fifth release. They revealed the title of their third studio album and its cover on November 10, 2013, on their official Facebook page. The album, Kindly Bent to Free Us, was released on February 14, 2014.

In May 2014, Paul Masvidal and Sean Reinert publicly revealed their homosexuality, a move that was broadly supported by the heavy metal community.

Breakup rumors, new music, and deaths (2015−2020) 
On September 10, 2015, Sean Reinert announced the disbandment of Cynic due to artistic and personal differences. Later that day, however, Masvidal claimed that there was no disbandment, and that Reinert did not consult with the other bandmates on the issue. He also announced that the band would continue in "one way or another." On September 18, 2015, it was confirmed that Cynic would perform without Reinert, and would recruit Trioscapes drummer Matt Lynch to fulfill a festival commitment, Germany's Euroblast Festival on October 3 as scheduled.

In 2017 Century Media released Uroboric Forms – The Complete Demo Collection 1988–1991.

On December 9, 2017, Reinert announced his split with Cynic, and stated "A settlement has been reached between Paul and I... I am at peace with the arrangement."

On January 15, 2018, Cynic digitally released "Humanoid", their first song in four years, and first one with Matt Lynch on drums instead of Sean Reinert. Loudersound listed Cynic on the 4th of July special amongst the Ten Great American Prog Rock Bands.

Reinert died on January 24, 2020. Hank Shteamer of Rolling Stone magazine wrote a tribute to Reinert shortly after his passing commemorating his contributions to Death and Cynic.

Malone died on December 9, 2020. On September 3, 2021, Paul Masvidal revealed that Malone died by suicide, as well as announced the release of a new version of "Integral" featuring a bass track recorded by Malone as tribute.

Ascension Codes (2021−present) 

On September 15, 2021, Cynic announced a new album titled Ascension Codes. A track from the album, "Mythical Serpents", was also released. The album was released on November 26, 2021. It was elected by Metal Hammer as the 3rd best progressive metal album of 2021. The song "Mythical Serpents" was elected by Loudwire as the 9th best metal song of 2021.

On August 1, 2022, it was announced that a remix of Focus had been completed by Masvidal and Warren Riker, with a release date to be determined.

On January 27, 2023, Cynic played their first live show in eight years at the Knitting Factory in Los Angeles. The "secret" gig had the band being billed as "Uroboric Forms", with the lineup consisting of Masvidal on vocals and guitar, Max Phelps on death growls and guitar, Brandon Griffin on bass, and Matt Lynch on drums and percussion. The performance served as a "warm-up" show before their appearance on the 70000 Tons of Metal cruise.

Musical style 
Cynic's first recordings feature a more punk rock, thrash metal, and hardcore punk sound, but in the 1990s their sound changed towards a highly complex, experimental and extremely technical form of progressive metal, while still retaining their death metal roots. Their 1990 demo displays a hyper-technical form of death/thrash, and the following 1991 Roadrunner demo bears a notable resemblance to Death and jazz-death metal pioneers Atheist, featuring two songs from Focus in cruder, more brutal form. Many influences from jazz and jazz-rock fusion can be heard on their debut album Focus. Focus has both "growls" and "robotic" vocals, using a vocoder. The offshoot Portal later released a demo recording that continues even further in the direction of progressive space rock, refining and softening up their sound.

Cynic's 2008 album Traced in Air melded together the styles and influences heard on 1993's Focus with the more progressive-oriented Portal approach. The result had Cynic put less emphasis on its extreme metal elements, with new guttural vocalist Tymon Kruidenier playing a smaller role than Tony Teegarden did on Focus. Additionally, Paul Masvidal all but abandoned his vocoder robotic vocals, opting instead for a more natural singing voice, with a subtler—although noticeable—vocoder layer that increases an octave his voice.

Cynic have been described as the founders of breath metal – a progressive, experimental subgenre of metal with strong ambient and ethereal aspects, directly informed by a meditation practice/observing the breath. In Cynic's music the sound of the actual breath is used as a musical signature and often cited in the lyrics or enunciated in how certain words are sung with a breathy phrase or passage.

  Example 1: Album – Focus, Track- Textures, Section: @1:20

 Example 2: Album – Traced In Air, Track- The Space For This, Section: Choruses, Lyrics: Breathe In, Breathe Out

 Example 3: Album – Kindly Bent To Free Us, Track- True Hallucination Speak, Section: Choruses, Lyrics: Inhale – you better get a friend to help you – exhale you've got to make amends with the truth

  Example 4: Album – Ascension Codes, Track- DNA Activation Template, Section: @2:12

Noting the journey from metal to the progressives, The New York Times proclaimed in a positive review of Traced in Air that:"Cynic should be understood not so much alongside any metal bands but along with the radical harmonic progressives in the last 45 years of pop and jazz: composers like Milton Nascimento, The Beach Boys or Pat Metheny."

In 2009, Chris Dick of Decibel Magazine inducted Cynic into the Decibel Hall of Fame with nothing but praises:"Cynic weren't emulators. The aggression was there. But the mindset contrasted vastly. In fact, more was owed to crossover heroes Ludichrist and thrash metal mavericks Voivod than to any band from the Sunshine State. They were innovators. Post-Andrew, Masvidal and company developed wider and deeper tastes, seamlessly stitching in new influences like jazz fusion, progressive rock and shoegaze to create new, imaginative shapes..."

Members 

Current
 Paul Masvidal – guitars, guitar synthesizer , lead vocals, vocoder , unclean vocals 
 Matt Lynch – drums 
 Dave Mackay – bass synthesizer, keyboards 

Live
 Max Phelps – guitars, backing vocals 
 Brandon Giffin – bass 
 Ezekiel Kaplan – keyboards, backing vocals, additional guitars 

Session
 Roopam Garg (Dark) – guitars 
 Plini – guitars 

Former
 Esteban "Steve" Rincon – lead vocals 
 Russell Mofsky – guitars 
 Mark Van Erp – bass 
 Sean Reinert – drums 
 Jason Gobel – guitars, keyboards 
 Tony Choy – bass 
 Sean Malone – bass 
 Chris Kringel – bass 
 Tymon Kruidenier – guitar, unclean vocals, guitar synthesizer 
 Robin Zielhorst – bass 

Former session
 Dana Cosley – keyboards, harsh vocals (live) 
 Tony Teegarden – keyboards, harsh vocals (studio and live) 

Timeline

Discography 
Studio albums
 Focus (1993)
 Traced in Air (2008)
 Kindly Bent to Free Us (2014)
 Ascension Codes (2021)
 Ascension Codes (Instrumentals) (2022)

EPs
 Re-Traced (2010)
 Carbon-Based Anatomy (2011)

Singles
 Humanoid (2018)

Compilation albums
 Uroboric Forms – The Complete Demo Recordings (2017)

References

Bibliography

External links 

 
 

1987 establishments in Florida
American progressive metal musical groups
American technical death metal musical groups
Articles which contain graphical timelines
Heavy metal musical groups from Florida
Musical groups established in 1987
Musical groups disestablished in 1994
Musical groups from Miami
Musical groups reestablished in 2006
Roadrunner Records artists
Season of Mist artists